Mohsen Bayat, born July 18, 1984, in Khansar is an Iranian football midfielder. He currently plays for Persian Gulf Pro League side Padideh.

Career
Bayat started his career with local side Polyacryl, before moving to Sepahan and then Saba Qom.

Club career statistics

References

1984 births
Living people
Iranian footballers
Persian Gulf Pro League players
Sepahan S.C. footballers
Saba players
Esteghlal Khuzestan players
People from Khansar
Association football defenders
Association football wingers